Howard McFarland Hall (February 2, 1885 – July 2, 1940) was an American early-era racecar driver. Hall competed in the inaugural 1911 Indianapolis 500 in a Velie.

Biography
He was born on February 2, 1885, in Toledo, Ohio, to Edmund  Hall and Jennie McFarland.  He was a mechanic for the Chevrolet team. In 1909, Hall competed in the Portola Road Race in San Francisco. Hall also served as a riding mechanic, serving with Bob Burman in the 1910 American Grand Prize Grand Prix race.

Hall oversaw the Velie's racing program during the 1910s.

After racing, went back home to Toledo and then moved to Fort Wayne, Indiana, Hall died on July 2, 1940, at the age of 55.

Indy 500 results

References

External links
Howard Hall at ChampCarStats.com

1885 births
Indianapolis 500 drivers
Sportspeople from Toledo, Ohio
Racing drivers from Ohio
Year of death missing